Jonas Brammen (born 19 July 1997) is a German footballer who plays as a goalkeeper for TuS Erndtebrück.

References

1997 births
Sportspeople from Hagen
Footballers from North Rhine-Westphalia
Living people
German footballers
Association football goalkeepers
SC Paderborn 07 players
FC Gütersloh 2000 players
1. FC Kaan-Marienborn players
Sportfreunde Lotte players
TuS Erndtebrück players
3. Liga players
Regionalliga players
Oberliga (football) players